Hyde Creek is a stream in Webster and Wright counties of southern Missouri. The stream headwaters are in western Wright County northwest of Hartville and south of Grovespring. The stream flows northwest to its confluence with Cantrell Creek in Webster County due west of Grovespring and east of Niangua.

Hyde Creek has the name of the local Hyde family who settled in the area before the Civil War.

See also
List of rivers of Missouri

References

Rivers of Webster County, Missouri
Rivers of Wright County, Missouri
Rivers of Missouri